The Red Rose (Spanish: La rosa roja) is a 1960 Spanish film directed by Carlos Serrano de Osma.

Cast
 Antonio Almorós 
 Rafael Bardem 
 Elena Espejo 
 Mikaela 
 Santiago Ontañón 
 Luis Peña 
 Pedro Porcel 
 Conrado San Martín

References

Bibliography 
 Bentley, Bernard. A Companion to Spanish Cinema. Boydell & Brewer, 2008.

External links 
 

1960 films
Spanish musical drama films
1960s Spanish-language films
Films directed by Carlos Serrano de Osma
1960s Spanish films